In ion trapping and atomic physics experiments, the Lamb Dicke regime (or Lamb Dicke limit) is a quantum regime in which the coupling (induced by an external light field) between an ion or atom's internal qubit states and its motional states is sufficiently small so that transitions that change the motional quantum number by more than one are strongly suppressed.

This condition is quantitively expressed by the inequality

Lamb Dicke parameter 

Considering the ion's motion along the direction of the static trapping potential of an ion trap (the axial motion in -direction), the trap potential can be validly approximated as quadratic around the equilibrium position and the ion's motion locally be considered as that of a quantum harmonic oscillator with quantum harmonic oscillator eigenstates . In this case the position operator  is given by

where 

The Lamb Dicke regime corresponds to the condition

The Lamb–Dicke parameter actually is defined as

Upon absorption or emission of a photon with momentum  the kinetic energy of the ion is changed by the amount of the recoil energy
 where the definition of the recoil frequency is

The square of the Lamb Dicke parameter then is given by

Hence the Lamb Dicke parameter  quantifies the coupling strength between internal states and motional states of an ion. If the Lamb Dicke parameter is much smaller than one, the quantized energy spacing of the harmonic oscillator is larger than the recoil energy and transitions changing the motional state of the ion are negligible. The Lamb Dicke parameter being small is a necessary, but not a sufficient condition for the Lamb Dicke regime.

Mathematical background 
In ion trapping experiments, laser fields are used to couple the internal state of an ion with its motional state. The mechanical recoil of the ion upon absorption or emission of a photon is described by the operators . These operators induce a displacement of the atomic momentum by the quantity  for the absorption (+) or emission (-) of a laser photon. In the basis of harmonic oscillator eigenstates , the probability for the transition  is given by the Franck-Condon coefficients

If the condition for the Lamb-Dicke regime is met, a Taylor expansion is possible,

The ladder operators act on the state  according to the rules 
If  is small, the  terms can be neglected, and the term  
can therefore be approximated as 
.
Since  unless ,
this expression vanishes unless ,
and it is readily seen that transitions between motional states which change the motional quantum number  by more than one are strongly suppressed.

Applicability 

In the Lamb Dicke regime spontaneous decay occurs predominantly at the frequency of the qubit's internal transition (carrier frequency) and therefore does not affect the ion's motional state most of the time. This is a necessary requirement for resolved sideband cooling to work efficiently.

Reaching the Lamb Dicke regime is a requirement for many of the schemes used to perform coherent operations on ions.  It therefore establishes the upper limit on the temperature of ions in order for these methods to create entanglement. During manipulations on ions with laser pulses, the ions cannot be laser cooled. They must therefore be initially cooled down to a temperature such that they stay in the Lamb Dicke regime during the entire manipulation process that creates entanglement.

See also

 Laser cooling
 Resolved sideband cooling

References and notes

Atomic physics